The 15th World Science Fiction Convention (Worldcon), also known as Loncon I, was held on 6–9 September 1957 at the King's Court Hotel in London, United Kingdom. It was the first Worldcon held outside North America.

The chairman was Ted Carnell.

Participants 

Attendance was 268.

Guests of Honour 

 John W. Campbell, Jr.

Programming and events 

Events included a "fancy dress ball" on the evening of Friday, 6 September.

Awards

1957 Hugo Awards 

The winners were:

 Best American Professional Magazine: Astounding Science Fiction, edited by John W. Campbell, Jr.
 Best British Professional Magazine: New Worlds, edited by John Carnell
 Best Fanzine: Science Fiction Times, edited by James V. Taurasi, Sr., Ray Van Houten, and Frank R. Prieto, Jr.

Because the 1957 International Fantasy Award was being given out in London at the same time, Loncon I chose not to compete with this similar literary award, which was given to J.R.R. Tolkien's The Lord of the Rings. As a result, only the three Hugo Awards for Best Professional Magazine and Best Fanzine were given out at the 1957 Worldcon. Both the International Fantasy Award and the Hugo Award shared the very same Chesley Bonestell-influenced finned rocketship design that year, the only time this has happened.

See also 

 Hugo Award
 Science fiction
 Speculative fiction
 World Science Fiction Society
 Worldcon

References

External links 

 nesfa.org - 1957 convention notes
 THEN Archive - 1957

1957 conferences
1957 in London
1957 in the United Kingdom
Science fiction conventions in Europe
Science fiction conventions in the United Kingdom
Worldcon